The 2006 Arab League Summit took place in Khartoum, Sudan, on March 28–30 2006. While speakers at the summit called for increased Arab sovereignty and stronger alliances between Arab states, it did not lead to any plans for action to those ends, and Qatari media outlet Al-Jazeera called it a "nadir" in the history of League summits.

References

2006 in politics
2006 Arab League summit
Diplomatic conferences in Sudan
2006 in Sudan
21st-century diplomatic conferences (MENA)
History of Khartoum
2006 in international relations
2006 conferences
21st century in Khartoum
March 2006 events in Africa